Avan Oru Ahankaari is a 1980 Indian Malayalam film, directed by K. G. Rajasekharan and produced by G. P. Balan. The film stars Sheela, Jose Prakash, Janardanan and M. G. Soman in the lead roles. The film has musical score by M. S. Viswanathan.

Cast
 
Sheela 
Jose Prakash 
Janardanan 
M. G. Soman 
Master Raghu

Soundtrack
The music was composed by M. S. Viswanathan.

References

External links
 

1980 films
1980s Malayalam-language films
Films scored by M. S. Viswanathan
Films directed by K. G. Rajasekharan